The year 1958 in television involved some significant events.
Below is a list of television-related events during 1958.

Events
January 1 – Suomen Televisio, later known as Yle TV1, begins regular broadcasting.
January 28 – Short-lived station KTRX signs on the air in Kennewick, Washington.
January 14 – Television Wales and the West (TWW), the first ITV franchise for South Wales and West of England, begins broadcasting.
January 17 – TV Peru, the first television channel in Peru, begins operations.
January 25 – Royal Thai Channel 5, officially launched in Bangkok, Thailand.
February 17 – Pope Pius XII designates St. Clare of Assisi the patron saint of television. Thereafter, placing her icon on a television set was said to improve reception.
April 19 – Chronicle Broadcasting Network, the predecessor of ABS-CBN in the Philippines, launches DZXL-TV Channel 9.
April 30 – Moldova TV signs on the air at 19:00, making it the very first television network in Moldova.
May 2 – CCTV-1 began on a experimental basis as Peking Television.
July 1 – The Canadian Broadcasting Corporation (CBC) links television broadcasting across Canada. The CBC's microwave network between Nova Scotia and British Columbia, completed this year, makes it the longest in the world.
August 23 – Television Belgrade, as predecessor for RTS1, a first regular television broadcasting station officially service start in Serbia, former part of Yugoslavia.  
August 30 – Southern Television, the ITV franchise for South Central and South East England, begins broadcasting.
September 16 – Orson Welles's The Fountain of Youth is broadcast on NBC-TV's Colgate Theatre. Filmed in 1956 for a proposed Desilu series, the half-hour program airs only once and becomes the only unsold pilot ever to win a Peabody Award.
Fall – The quiz show scandals resulted in the cancellation of the original big-money game show, CBS' "The $64,000 Question", and creating havoc within the US television industry.
October 1 – Shanghai Television, as early television station launched in China, first regular service to start.
October 3 – Television Iran, as predecessor of IRIB TV1, a first regular program service television broadcasting station launched in Iran. 
October 17 – Fred Astaire makes his TV starring debut in the NBC special, An Evening with Fred Astaire, which later won nine Emmy Awards and is one of the first TV specials to be preserved on videotape.
September 20 – Radio Valencia Televisión signs on the air in Venezuela with test transmissions began on April 30.
November 30 – During the live broadcast of the Armchair Theatre play Underground on the ITV network in the UK, actor Gareth Jones suffers a fatal heart attack between two of his scenes while in make-up.
December 15 – Channel 4, the flagship station of América Televisión, as well as the first every privately owned television station in Peru, begins officially regular broadcasting service first to viewers in Lima.
SF DRS, the German-language Swiss television channel, debuts.
Ampex demonstrates their design for a color video tape recorder.
In the United Kingdom, the top-rated show of the year is the ITV game show Dotto, adapted from an American game show which in turn was based on children's Connect the dots game.
The original American version of "Dotto" was the first game show to be implicated in the quiz show scandals, and was  cancelled in August.
Top-rated prime-time game show Twenty-One is cancelled by NBC in October after former contestant Herb Stempel charged that the series was rigged and that he had been ordered to lose a match to the popular Charles Van Doren.
DuMont company sells its television manufacturing assets to Emerson company. The quality decreases.

Programs/programmes
Gillette Cavalcade of Sports (1946–1960)
Howdy Doody (1947–1960)
Meet the Press (1947–present)
Candid Camera (1948–present)
The Ed Sullivan Show (1948–1971)
Bozo the Clown (1949–present)
Come Dancing (UK) (1949–1995)
The Voice of Firestone (1949–1963)
The Jack Benny Show (1950–1965)
Truth or Consequences (1950–1988)
What's My Line (1950–1967)
Your Hit Parade (1950–1959)
Dragnet (1951–1959)
Westinghouse Desilu Playhouse (1958–1960)
I Love Lucy (1951–1960)
Love of Life (1951–1980)
Search for Tomorrow (1951–1986)
Sergeant Preston of the Yukon (1955-1958)
Hallmark Hall of Fame (1951–present)
American Bandstand (1952–1989)
The Adventures of Ozzie and Harriet (1952–1966)
The Guiding Light (1952–2009)
The Today Show (1952–present)
This Is Your Life (1952–1961)
Panorama (UK) (1953–present)
The Good Old Days (UK) (1953–1983)
Disneyland (1954–1958) ends on September 3, to resume on September 12 as Walt Disney Presents (1958–1961)
Face the Nation (1954–present)
The Brighter Day (1954–1962)
The Milton Berle Show (1954–1967)
The Secret Storm (1954–1974)
The Tonight Show (1954–present)
Zoo Quest (UK) (1954–1964)
Alfred Hitchcock Presents (1955–1962)
Captain Kangaroo (1955–1984)
Cheyenne (1955–1962)
Dixon of Dock Green (UK) (1955–1976)
Gunsmoke (1955–1975)
Jubilee USA (1955–1960)
Mickey Mouse Club (1955–1959)
The Lawrence Welk Show (1955–1982)
This Is Your Life (UK) (1955–2003)
Armchair Theatre (UK) (1956–1968)
As the World Turns (1956–2010)
The Ford Show, Starring Tennessee Ernie Ford (1956–1961)
Hancock's Half Hour (UK) (1956–1962)
Opportunity Knocks (UK) (1956–1978)
The Edge of Night (1956–1984)
The Gale Storm Show, Oh! Susanna (1956–1960)
The Price Is Right (1956–1965)
The Steve Allen Show (1956–1960)
What the Papers Say (UK) (1956–2008)
The Pat Boone Chevy Showroom (1957–1960)
The Army Game (UK) (1957–1961)
Leave It to Beaver (1957–1963)
The Real McCoys (1957-1963)
The Sky at Night (UK) (1957–present)
General Motors Presents (1953–1956, 1958–1961)

Debuts
January 4 – Sea Hunt in syndication (1958–1961)
January 20 – Love That Jill on ABC (1958)
 March 14 – Stahlnetz on West Germany's ARD  (1958–1968)
 April 19 – The Adventures of Nicholas Nickleby on Italy's RAI 1 (1958)
June 16 – Variety View (1958–1959) (Melbourne, Australia)
June 19 – Confession, hosted by Jack Wyatt, on ABC (1958–1959)
June 23 – Polka Go-Round on ABC (1958–1959)
August 25  – Concentration on NBC (1958–1973)
September 6 – Wanted Dead or Alive on CBS (1958–1961)
September 22 – Peter Gunn on NBC (1958–1961)
September 24 – The Donna Reed Show on ABC (1958–1966)
September 30 – The Rifleman on ABC (1958–1963)
October 2 
 Behind Closed Doors on NBC (1958–1959)
 The Huckleberry Hound Show, Hanna Barbera's second series (1958–1962)
 The Unforeseen on CBC (1958–1960)
October 5 
Lawman on ABC (1958–1962)
Encounter, an anthology series originating from Toronto, Ontario, Canada, began a five-week run on ABC, having been cancelled after the November 2 episode
October 8 – Bat Masterson on NBC (1958–1961)
October 10 
77 Sunset Strip on ABC (1958–1964)
Grandstand on BBC Television (1958–2007)
October 15 – Mole's Adventure (Japan), the oldest surviving anime television show.
October 16 – Blue Peter, the world's longest-running children's TV programme, debuts on BBC Television (1958–present)
October 17 – An Evening With Fred Astaire on NBC; first show prerecorded on color videotape, wins nine Emmy Awards
November 4 – Flight (1958–1959) syndicated premiere on NBC NYC; produced by California National Presentation
November 7 – Our Mutual Friend on BBC Television (1958–1959)
December 22 – Quatermass and the Pit on BBC Television (1958–1959)
Autumn Affair (1958–1959), the first Australian-produced television soap opera (on ATN-7 in Sydney, starting 1959 also shown on GTV-9 in Melbourne)
Café Continental (1958–1961) (Sydney and Melbourne Australia)
Don Messer's Jubilee (1958–1969)
The Friendly Giant (1958–1985)
The Shirley Abicair Show (1958) (Sydney and Melbourne Australia)
Your Life in Their Hands on BBC Television (1958–1964 and many revivals)
Unknown – This is Alice in first-run syndication (1958–1959)

Ending this year

Births

References